The National Archaeological Museum of Tarragona (Catalan: Museu Nacional Arqueològic de Tarragona, MNAT) is a public museum located in the city of Tarragona (Catalonia, Spain) focusing on its rich historical heritage and ancient remains. It includes archaeological findings of Tarraco's Roman and Early Christian past, as well as a library. The museum's origins lay in the 19th century, making it the oldest of its kind in Catalonia, with some collections assembling objects found from the 16th century onwards, but with most discoveries having taken place in the last 150 years.

It is part of the Roman Europe network of museums.

Gallery

See also

Archaeology Museum of Catalonia

References

External links
MNAT official website
 Museu Nacional Arqueològic de Tarragona  (MNAT) at Google Cultural Institute

Tarragona
Archaeological museums in Catalonia
Museums of ancient Rome in Spain